The Jungle Book is an 1894 collection of stories written by Rudyard Kipling.

The Jungle Book may also refer to:

Films 
 Rudyard Kipling's Jungle Book (1942), a live-action film adaptation by United Artists
 The Jungle Book (1967 film), an animated film adaptation by Disney
The Jungle Book 2 (2003), a sequel to Disney's 1967 film
 The Jungle Book (1994 film)
 The Jungle Book (2016 film), Disney's third live-action remake of the 1967 animated film
The Jungle Book (1992), an animated film from Bevanfield Films
Jungle Book (1995), an animated film from Jetlag Productions
 The Jungle Book: Mowgli's Story (1998), Disney's second remake of the 1967 animated film, in which many of the plot elements are changed

Television 
 The Jungle Book (1989 TV series), a Japanese anime series
 The Jungle Book (2010 TV series), a 2010 CGI TV series

Other uses
 Harvey Kurtzman's Jungle Book, a 1959 graphic novel
 The Jungle Book (Disney franchise)
 The Jungle Book (1967 soundtrack)
 The Jungle Book (2016 soundtrack)
 The Jungle Book (video game), a 1994 adaptation of the 1967 film
 The Jungle Book Groove Party, a 2000 dance video game
 The Jungle Book: Alive with Magic, a 2016 amusement ride
 The Jungle Book, an EP by That Handsome Devil

See also
 Adaptations of The Jungle Book
 The Second Jungle Book, an 1895 collection of Kipling stories
 The Third Jungle Book, a 1992 pastiche story collection by Pamela Jekel
The Second Jungle Book: Mowgli & Baloo (1997), a live-action film adaptation by TriStar Pictures